King's Fork High School is located in Suffolk, Virginia. It is administered by Suffolk City Public Schools. The school colors are maroon and Vegas gold, and the official mascot is the Bulldog.

King's Fork was founded in 2003, and was designed by the architectural firm of Ripley Rodriguez Maddox Motley. It was commissioned by Suffolk City Public Schools due to a widespread economic expansion in sprawl in the western Hampton Roads area.

Due to rezoning, students at King's Fork High are drawn from the Northwestern quadrants of the city, including the King's Fork area, Crittenden, and Hobson. Students are also drawn from the southern Nansemond Parkway/Wilroy Road area, and shares Downtown neighborhoods with Lakeland High School.

Building design
According to Ripley Rodriguez Maddox Motley, "Each house contains space for assistant principal, guidance counselor, teacher work areas, general classrooms, science labs, and resource spaces in addition to two to three specialized career/technical subjects. A guidance suite was also included near Administration for flexibility in future guidance arrangements. Science labs are designed as generically as possible with only Chemistry having a necessary uniqueness. Each pair of science lecture spaces shares a wet lab and preparation partitions. Specialty subjects such as Agriculture, Work/Family Studies, Health, JROTC, and Liberal Arts that are not suited for location within houses are properly placed according to need and required access. Instructional areas typically share a small computer lab. The small lab requires less building area but offers more computers per classroom when time-sharing is utilized."

Curriculum
King's Fork High School offers an extensive range of courses at core, honors, and Advanced Placement levels, in addition to various dual enrollment classes offered through the Hobbs campus of Paul D. Camp Community College, also located in Suffolk, and through Tidewater Community College. In addition to academic courses, King's Fork High offers a range of agricultural and resource management courses.

Due to the nature of student interests at the school, only certain core subjects are offered at the AP level at King's Fork, and the arts department often has too few students for courses in music theory or other such classes. However, beginning in the 2008–2009 school year, King's Fork began offering courses beginning at the freshman level through the IB (International Baccalaureate) program, in addition to its current curriculum.

Extracurricular activities

King's Fork High has an athletic program; however, due to the school's relative new status, few of the programs have yet to build up to a successful level. The most notable of these are men's and women's varsity basketball teams, which have broken through to the district and regional level. The 2008-2009 men's varsity basketball team won the AAA state championship.

The first extracurricular program to achieve statewide recognition from King's Fork was the drama program, which won second place at the 2006 AAA VHSL Theater Festival, under the direction of former drama teacher Clyde Berry.

In 2017, the Bulldogs football team made school history by winning its first ever Southeastern District title. Notable about the victory was the fact that King's Fork upset longtime powerhouse Oscar Smith, and ended Smith's 99-game district win streak - which dated back to 2006 - in a 29–23 win.

In 2017-2018 Kings fork high school Mighty Marching Bulldogs would travel to Charlotte North Carolina to compete in the High-Step Nationals Competition with Marching Bands all throughout the United States. The MMB would achieve 1st place in Class 3A, with top scoring Dance Team, Majorettes, and 2nd Highest Flag Team at the event. The group would be awarded 3rd place overall in the Nation.

In 2020, the Bulldogs men's basketball team won another state championship, sharing the VHSL title with Woodrow Wilson High School (Virginia) of Portsmouth. The schools were scheduled to play one another in the championship, which was cancelled due to the COVID-19 outbreak. The VHSL cancelled all championship games following the semifinals; the schools slated to play in the championships were subsequently named co-champions.

Sports

Clubs 

Art
Band 
Charming Young Ladies 
Chorus
DECA
Drama Club
FBLA
Fellowship of Christian Athletes
International Club
Kennel Watchdog Club
Key Club
National Honor Society
Robotics
Scholastic Bowl
Spirit Club
Student Council Association
Technology Student Association
Video Game Club
Yearbook
Student Council Association

Notable alumni
Lex Luger - Record Producer
Sugar Rodgers - WNBA guard for the New York Liberty
Chuck Clark - NFL safety for the New York Jets
Lataisia Jones - First black recipient of a Doctor of Philosophy degree at the Florida State University College of Medicine
Davante Gardner - Professional basketball overseas in Japan for the Nishinomiya Storks & Marquette Golden Eagles men's basketball (2010–2014)
Davon Grayson - Davon Grayson is one of nine receivers who were added to the 2017 Biletnikoff Award Watch List...; In 2018 Davon Grayson signed with the New York Giants, becoming the second Bulldog in back to back years to be signed or drafted by an NFL team.
Frank Bane - first executive director of the Social Security Board, and former principal of King's Fork High School
HighDefRazjah - Platinum and Gold Music Producer who worked with A$AP Ferg , Rae Sremmurd , Jay IDK and more. Graduated 2010.

References

Educational institutions established in 2003
International Baccalaureate schools in Virginia
Public high schools in Virginia
Schools in Suffolk, Virginia
2003 establishments in Virginia